Yangrang is a village in the Lahaul region of Himachal Pradesh, India. It is 25 km away from Keylong. It is a small village situated on the left bank of the river Chandrabhaga. The Nag temple is situated here.

References

Villages in Lahaul and Spiti district